Euphrosyne Doxiadis (born 19 April 1946) is a Greek artist and writer. She was born in Athens and studied art in Salzburg, at the Cranbrook Academy of Art in Michigan, and at the Slade School of Fine Art and the Wimbledon School of Art in London. In 1995, she published a book on the Fayum portraits, titled The Mysterious Fayum Portraits: Faces from Ancient Egypt. The book received widespread critical acclaim. 

She lives and works in Athens and Paris.

References

Writers from Athens
1946 births 
Artists from Athens
Living people
Alumni of the Slade School of Fine Art